Grønvoll is a village in the municipality of Nittedal, Norway. Its population (2005) is 1,530.

Villages in Akershus